Victor Perli (born 1 February 1982) is a German politician. Born in Bad Oeynhausen, Lower Saxony, he represents The Left. Victor Perli has served as a member of the Bundestag from the state of Lower Saxony since 2017.

Life 
Perli was born in Bad Oeynhausen as the child of an Italian-Dutch working-class family. The family moved to Wolfenbüttel in 1993, where Perli graduated from the Gymnasium im Schloss in 2001. He then studied political science, sociology and modern history, first at the TU Braunschweig and from 2006 at the University of Potsdam. He completed his studies with the academic degree Magister Artium (M.A.) and subsequently worked as managing director of a family business. He became member of the bundestag after the 2017 German federal election. He is a member of the budget committee.

References

External links 

  
 Bundestag biography 

1982 births
Living people
Members of the Bundestag for Lower Saxony
Members of the Bundestag 2021–2025
Members of the Bundestag 2017–2021
Members of the Bundestag for The Left